Rikhan or Reykhan may refer to:

Rikhan, Lorestan, a village in Lorestan Province, Iran
Reykhan, South Khorasan, a village in South Khorasan Province, Iran
Rikhan 1, or Rikhan-e Yek, a village in Lorestan Province in Iran
Rikhan 2, or Rikhan-e Do, a village in Lorestan Province, Iran
Rikhan 3, Rikhan-e Seh, a village in Lorestan Province, Iran
Rikhan, Zanjan, a village in Zanjan Province, Iran

See also
Rihan (disambiguation)